The La Loche River is a tributary of the Ashuapmushuan River, flowing into the unorganized territory of Ashuapmushuan Lake, into the Regional County Municipality (RCM) of Le Domaine-du-Roy, in the administrative region of Saguenay-Lac-Saint-Jean, in Quebec, in Canada.

"La Loche River" flows in the townships of Le Ber, Cazeneuve, Mignault and Denault. The lower part of the river crosses the Ashuapmushuan Wildlife Reserve. Forestry is the main economic activity of this valley; recreational tourism activities, second.

The forest road R0203 (North-South direction) serves the lower part of the La Loche river valley; this road begins at the junction of route 167 which links Chibougamau to Saint-Félicien, Quebec. Going up north, the R0203 road branches off to the northeast to reach the Hilarion River.

The surface of La Loche River is usually frozen from early November to mid-May, however, safe ice circulation is generally from mid-November to mid-April.

Geography

Toponymy 
Formerly, this river has been designated "River aux Aulnes".

The toponym "La Loche River" was formalized on December 5, 1968, at the Commission de toponymie du Québec, when it was created.

Notes and references

See also 
Ashuapmushuan River, a watercourse
Ashuapmushuan Lake, a body of water
Little Chief River, a watercourse
Lac-Ashuapmushuan, Quebec, an unorganized territory
Le Domaine-du-Roy, a regional county municipality (MRC)

Rivers of Saguenay–Lac-Saint-Jean
Le Domaine-du-Roy Regional County Municipality